Sultan Awais Jalayir (also written as Uvais or Uways or Oways) was a Jalayirid ruler of Basra, in southern Iraq (1415–1421), with his rule ending in 1421 with his death. He was the son of Shah Walad Jalayir. In 1415, Sultan Awais Jalayir succeeded his brother Sultan Mahmud Jalayir as Jalayirid ruler. During his reign, he conducted two campaigns against the Black Sheep Turkmen in an attempt to recover Baghdad for the Jalayirids. While conducting the second campaign he was killed in battle. He was succeeded by another brother, Sultan Muhammad Jalayir.

See also
 List of Jalayirid rulers at Jalairid Sultanate

External links
"Jalayerids". Encyclopaedia Iranica. Center for Iranian Studies, Columbia University. June 16, 2004. Retrieved March 23, 2006.

1421 deaths
Jalayirids
Military personnel killed in action
Year of birth unknown